The 2005 United Nations Security Council election was held on 10 October 2005 during the 60th session of the United Nations General Assembly, held at United Nations Headquarters in New York City. The elections were for five non-permanent seats on the UN Security Council for two-year mandates commencing on 1 January 2006. The countries elected were the Republic of the Congo, Ghana, Peru, Qatar, and Slovakia with Qatar and Slovakia being elected for the first time.

Geographic distribution
In accordance with the rules whereby the ten non-permanent UNSC seats rotate among the various regional blocs into which UN member states traditionally divide themselves for voting and representation purposes, the five available seats were allocated as follows:
Two for Africa (then held by Algeria and Benin)
One for Asia (then held by the Philippines)
One for Eastern Europe (then held by Romania)
One for Latin America and the Caribbean (then held by Brazil)

Results
The five members (elected by a two-thirds majority of the General Assembly, in as many rounds of voting as it takes to achieve that majority) served on the Security Council for the 2006–07 period.

There were six candidates for five spots on the Council: Congo, Ghana, Nicaragua, Qatar, Peru, and Slovakia.

There was a total of 191 ballots in each of the three elections. For each geographic group, each member state could vote for as many candidates as were to be elected. Voting was done by secret ballot.

African and Asian States (three to be elected)
Congo 188
Ghana 184
Qatar 186
Indonesia 1
abstentions 2

Eastern European States (one to be elected)
Slovakia 185
abstentions 6

Latin American and Caribbean States (one to be elected)
Peru 144
Nicaragua 43
abstentions 4

See also
List of members of the United Nations Security Council
European Union and the United Nations

References
UN Document GA/10401 General Assembly press release
UN News Centre

2005
2005 elections
2005 in international relations
Non-partisan elections
October 2005 events